Conditions of a Punk is the second studio album by American band Half Alive, released on December 2, 2022, via RCA Records. It was preceded by the singles "What's Wrong", "Summerland", "Make of It", "Hot Tea", "Move Me", "Did I Make You Up?", and "High Up".

Background
Starting in early 2021, Half Alive began promotion of their planned sophomore record, Give Me Your Shoulders, which was announced as a two part album. Five singles were released before the release of the first part, Give Me Your Shoulders, Pt. 1, on February 11, 2022.

On September 12, 2022, the band announced the cancellation of Give Me Your Shoulders, Pt. 2 via the release of a spoken word track titled "Night Swims (poem)". On October 13, the first single for the new album, “Did I Make You Up?”, was released alongside the official announcement of Conditions of a Punk. A release date of December 2 was announced. The album’s track list, which includes every track from Give Me Your Shoulders, Pt. 1, was announced on October 20. The day before the album was released, the band announced the Conditions Of A Punk Tour that would take place in North America and the UK in 2023. 

According to Josh Taylor, the album marks the first time that the band allowed themselves to write about the topic of love. Comparing it to their first album, Now, Not Yet is more cerebral, speaking about a subject (e.g. trust or rest), while Conditions of a Punk is more emotional with the band now singing to a subject instead.  The religious undertones seen in the former are present in the latter as well, described as being "about a person and God in the same breath." The album title derives from Taylor's personal experiences, who agrees with his past characterization as a "punk" from friends in the egotistical, self-serving connotation of the word. The songs are therefore informed by a decade of "unlearning what [he] thought Love was", depicting the death of the ego and the punk via the breaking and mending of a heart.

Singles
"What's Wrong" was released as the first single from the album on March 31, 2021. This was followed by the release of a non-album single, "Time 2", on May 26. "Summerland" was released as the album's second single on July 23. The third single, "Make of It", was released on September 16. The fourth single, "Hot Tea", was released on November 19. The fifth, "Move Me", was released on February 11, 2022, along with the rest of Give Me Your Shoulders, Pt. 1. "Did I Make You Up?" was released as the album's sixth single on October 13. "High Up" was released as the seventh single on November 11.

Track listing
All tracks are written by Josh Taylor, Brett Kramer, and J Tyler Johnson; additional writers are as indicated.

Note
  signifies an additional producer

Personnel
Half Alive
 Josh Taylor – vocals (all tracks), engineering (track 18)
 Brett Kramer – drums (all tracks), engineering (18)
 J. Tyler Johnson – bass guitar (all tracks), engineering (18)

Additional musicians
 Mark Williams – programming (tracks 2, 6, 13, 16)
 Raul Cubina – programming (2, 6, 13, 16)
 Emiko Bankson – strings (4, 15)
 Rachel Kramer – chorus master (5), background vocals (7)
 Alexa Cappelli – choir (5)
 Gregory Fletcher – choir (5)
 Sophia James – choir (5)
 VJ Rosales – choir (5)

Technical

 Dale Becker – mastering
 Joe LaPorta – mastering (13)
 Lars Stalfors – mixing (1, 14, 18)
 Tom Elmhirst – mixing (2, 8)
 Mike Crossey – mixing (3)
 Geoff Swan – mixing (4, 7, 9, 10)
 Neal Pogue – mixing (5, 11, 16)
 Manny Marroquin – mixing (6, 15, 17)
 Rob Cohen – mixing (12)
 Jon Castelli – mixing (13)
 Jonny Bell – engineering, recording (15)
 Connor Hedge – engineering assistance
 Katie Harvey – engineering assistance
 Noah McCorkle – engineering assistance
 Fili Filizzola – engineering assistance (2, 5, 8, 11, 12, 16)
 Hector Vega – engineering assistance (2, 5, 8, 11, 12, 16)
 Matthew Scatchell – engineering assistance (2, 8)
 Chris Galland – engineering assistance (6, 15, 17)
 Jeremie Inhaber – engineering assistance (6, 15, 17)
 Robin Florent – engineering assistance (6, 15, 17)
 Ingmar Carlson  – engineering assistance (13)
 Ryan Nasci – engineering assistance (13)

References

2022 albums
Half Alive (band) albums